Salvia officinalis, the common sage or just sage, is a perennial, evergreen subshrub, with woody stems, grayish leaves, and blue to purplish flowers. It is a member of the mint family Lamiaceae and native to the Mediterranean region, though it has been naturalized in many places throughout the world. It has a long history of medicinal and culinary use, and in modern times it has been used as an ornamental garden plant. The common name "sage" is also used for closely related species and cultivars.

Names
Salvia officinalis has numerous common names. Some of the best-known are sage, common sage, garden sage, golden sage, kitchen sage, true sage, culinary sage, Dalmatian sage, and broadleaf sage. Cultivated forms include purple sage and red sage.  The specific epithet officinalis refers to plants with a well-established medicinal or culinary value.

Taxonomy
Salvia officinalis was described by Carl Linnaeus in 1753. It has been grown for centuries in the Old World for its food and healing properties, and was often described in old herbals for the many miraculous properties attributed to it. 
The binary name, officinalis, refers to the plant's medicinal use—the officina was the traditional storeroom of a monastery where herbs and medicines were stored. S. officinalis has been classified under many other scientific names over the years, including six different names since 1940 alone. It is the type species for the genus Salvia.

Description

Cultivars are quite variable in size, leaf and flower color, and foliage pattern, with many variegated leaf types. The plant flowers in late spring or summer. Leaves are grey-green, rugose on the upper side, and nearly white underneath due to the many short soft hairs. Modern cultivars include leaves with purple, rose, cream, and yellow in many variegated combinations.

History

Salvia officinalis has been used since ancient times for warding off evil, snakebites, increasing women's fertility, and more. The Romans referred to sage as the "holy herb," and employed it in their religious rituals. Theophrastus wrote about two different sages, a wild undershrub he called sphakos, and a similar cultivated plant he called elelisphakos. Pliny the Elder said the latter plant was called salvia by the Romans, and used as a diuretic, a local anesthetic for the skin, a styptic, and for other uses. Charlemagne recommended the plant for cultivation in the early Middle Ages, and during the Carolingian Empire, it was cultivated in monastery gardens. Walafrid Strabo described it in his poem Hortulus as having a sweet scent and being useful for many human ailments—he went back to the Greek root for the name and called it lelifagus.

The plant had a high reputation throughout the Middle Ages, with many sayings referring to its healing properties and value. It was sometimes called S. salvatrix (sage the savior). Dioscorides, Pliny, and Galen all recommended sage as a diuretic, hemostatic, emmenagogue, and tonic.
Le Menagier de Paris, in addition to recommending cold sage soup and sage sauce for poultry, recommends infusion of sage for washing hands at table. John Gerard's Herball (1597) states that sage "is singularly good for the head and brain, it quickeneth the senses and memory, strengtheneth the sinews, restoreth health to those that have the palsy, and taketh away shakey trembling of the members." Gervase Markham's The English Huswife (1615) gives a recipe for a tooth-powder of sage and salt. It appears in recipes for Four Thieves Vinegar, a blend of herbs which was supposed to ward off the plague. In past centuries, it was also used for hair care, insect bites and wasp stings, nervous conditions, mental conditions, oral preparations for inflammation of the mouth, tongue and throat, and also to reduce fevers.

Uses

Culinary use

 

In Britain, sage has for generations been listed as one of the essential herbs, along with parsley, rosemary, and thyme (as in the folk song "Scarborough Fair"). It has a savory, slightly peppery flavor.  Sage appears in the 14th and 15th centuries in a "Cold Sage Sauce", known in French, English and Lombard cuisine, probably traceable to its appearance in Le Viandier de Taillevent. It appears in many European cuisines, notably Italian, Balkan and Middle Eastern cookery. In Italian cuisine, it is an essential condiment for saltimbocca and other dishes, favored with fish. In British and American cooking, it is traditionally served as sage and onion stuffing, an accompaniment to roast turkey or chicken at Christmas or Thanksgiving Day, and for Sunday roast dinners. Other dishes include pork casserole, Sage Derby cheese and Lincolnshire sausages. Despite the common use of traditional and available herbs in French cuisine, sage never found favor there.

Essential oil

Common sage is grown in parts of Europe for distillation of an essential oil, although other species such as Salvia fruticosa may also be harvested and distilled with it.

Research
Extracts of Salvia officinalis and S. lavandulaefolia are under preliminary research for their potential effects on human brain function. The thujone present in Salvia extracts may be neurotoxic.

Cultivars
In favourable conditions in the garden, S. officinalis can grow to a substantial size (1 square metre or more), but a number of cultivars are more compact.  As such they are valued as small ornamental flowering shrubs, rather than for their herbal properties. Some provide low ground cover, especially in sunny dry environments. Like many herbs they can be killed by a cold wet winter, especially if the soil is not well drained. But they are easily propagated from summer cuttings, and some cultivars are produced from seeds.

Named cultivars include:
 'Alba', a white-flowered cultivar
 'Aurea', golden sage 
 'Berggarten', a cultivar with large leaves, which rarely blooms, extending the useful life of the leaves 
 'Extrakta', has leaves with higher oil concentrations
 'Icterina', a cultivar with yellow-green variegated leaves
 'Lavandulaefolia', a small leaved cultivar
 'Purpurascens' ('Purpurea'), a purple-leafed cultivar
 'Tricolor', a cultivar with white, purple and green variegated leaves
'Icterina' and 'Purpurascens' have gained the Royal Horticultural Society's Award of Garden Merit.

Hybrids

 Sage. longispicata × Sage. farinacea (“Hybrid”)
 Sage. fruticosa × Sage. tomentosa (“Hybrid”)
 Sage. officinalis × Sage. lavandulifolia (“Hybrid”)
 Sage Amistad shrub, upright perennial, deep blue/purple flowers (“Hybrid”)
 Salvie Dyson's Joy “Salvie Dyson's Joy”, small, bushy perennial, multi-colored red / pink flowers (“Hybrid”)
 Sage Hot Lips shrub evergreen, “evergreen” red and white flowers, red/white flowers (“Hybrid”)
 Sage Jezebel shrub evergreen perennial, “evergreen perennial” red flowers (“Hybrid”)
 Salvie Nachtvlinder shrub evergreen, “evergreen” perennial, purple flowers (“Hybrid”)
 Sage Ribambelle bushy perennial, salmon-colored “salmon-colored” flowers (“Hybrid”)
 Sage Royal Bumble evergreen “evergreen” shrub, red flowers (“Hybrid”)
 Sage. × Jamensis Javier shrub, perennial, purple flowers (“Hybrid”)
 Sage. × Jamensis Los Lirios shrub, pink flowers (“Hybrid”)
 Sage. × Jamensis Peter Vidgeon shrub, perennial, light pink “light pink” flowers (“Hybrid”)
 Sage. × Jamensis Raspberry Royale evergreen, subshrub, raspberry pink flowers (“Hybrid”)
 Sage. × Superba Rubin clump-forming, perennial, pink flowers (“Hybrid”)
 Sage. × Sylvestris Blauhügel herbaceous, perennial, violet-blue flowers (“Hybrid”)
 Sage. × Sylvestris Mainacht perennial, deep violet flowers (“Hybrid”)
 Sage. × Sylvestris Tänzerin perennial, purple flowers (“Hybrid”)
 Salvia × sylvestris (Salvia × sylvestris) (“Hybrid”)
 Salvia 'Indigo Spiers (Salvia. longispicata × Salvia. farinacea) (“Hybrid”)
 Sage Mystic Spiers Blue, Salvia Mystic Spires Blue, Sage mystic Spiers Blue or Sage mystic Spiers Blue, Salvia x Mystic Spires, Mystic Spires Blue Salvia, Salvia 'Mystic Spires Blue' (Sage. longispicata × Sage. farinacea) (“Hybrid”)
 Salvia Mystic Spires
 Perennial sage (Salvia x superba) ("Hybrid")
 Salvia × superba (Salvia × superba) (Salvia guaranitica) (“Hybrid“)
 Salvia x hybrida 'Amistad', Salvia Amistad (Salvia 'Amistad''') (“Hybrid“)
 Salvia x 'Love and Wishes', Saliva sage 'Kisses and Wishes' (Salvia 'Love And Wishes') (Love and Wishes Sage) type Perennial (“Hybrid“)
 Salvia 'Oceana Blue'
 Salvia 'Strawberry Lake'
 Raspberry Delight Salvia (“Hybrid“)
 Salvia x 'Raspberry Truffle', (Raspberry Truffle Sage) Hybrid sages with Big Mexican Scarlet Sage parentage, (Salvia x "Raspberry Truffle') (Salvia gesnerifolia) (“Hybrid“)
 Salvia splendens 'Sao Borja' (Sao Borja Scarlet Sage)
 Salvia 'Black Knight', Salvia, Common Sage Salvia 'Black Knight' (Salvia guaranitica'')
 Sage (salvia 'indigo Spires') Indigo Spires' sage, SALVIA L. indigo spires

See also 
 Salvia
 List of Salvia species

References

External links

 Salvia officinalis Israel Native Plants
 
 Salviae officinalis folium, European Medicines Agency

Herbs
officinalis
Medicinal plants
Flora of the Mediterranean Basin
Mediterranean cuisine
Plants described in 1753
Taxa named by Carl Linnaeus
Flora of Malta